The Goolwa was a three-masted, composite-hulled clipper ship that was built for the trade between Great Britain and South Australia. She was built in Scotland in 1864 and sank in the Western Approaches in 1888.

Building
Alexander Hall & Co built The Goolwa at Aberdeen, completing her in March 1864. Her composite hull had an iron frame and timber planks. She had three masts, and was built as a full-rigged ship.

Hall built the ship for Anderson, Thompson & Co, who ran the Orient Line of clippers between London and South Australia. Her owners registered the ship as The Goolwa, presumably to distinguish her from other ships already called Goolwa. Her United Kingdom official number was 48750 and her code letters were VWCT.

Career
The Goolwas first Master was Captain Adam Johnston, (c. 1824 – 16 March 1891, who had commanded Travancore in 1862. He went on to command Aurora (sister ship to ) in 1875, and Harbinger 1876–78.

In 1877 one A Lawrence acquired The Goolwa. In 1887 one G Cowper acquired her, and re-registered her in Glasgow.

By 1877 The Goolwas sail plan had been reduced to a barque. From 1877 until 1885 her Master was John T. Thorkeldson or Torkelson.

Loss
The Goolwa left Penarth in Wales under Captain Cornwall on 23 December 1887 with a cargo of pig iron and coke bound for San Francisco. She experienced heavy weather in the Channel, and sprang two leaks, with which her two manual pumps were unable to cope. Meanwhile, the ship was rolling heavily, the waves carried away her hatches, water poured into her holds and she began to sink. Her lifeboats had been wrecked in the storm, one of her pumps failed, and all but five of her crew were incapacitated. Her crew fired distress rockets, and after two days the steamship Cato rescued them. The Goolwa was abandoned on 5 January 1888 and sank about 100 miles west of the Isles of Scilly.

Some other clippers on the England to Adelaide service

References

1864 ships
Barques
Full-rigged ships
Maritime incidents in January 1888
Sailing ships of the United Kingdom
Ships built by Alexander Hall and Sons
Shipwrecks in the Atlantic Ocean